The following is a list of awards and nominations received by Kelsey Grammer throughout his career. Grammer has been honored with many awards and nominations throughout his career. For his role in the sitcom, Frasier, he won two Golden Globe awards for Best Lead Actor in a Television Series - Comedy or Musical in 1996 and 2001, four Primetime Emmy awards for Outstanding Lead Actor in a Comedy Series in 1994, 1995, 1998 and 2004, and a Screen Actors Guild award for Outstanding Performance by an Ensemble in a Comedy Series in 2000.

Major associations

Golden Globe Awards 
3 wins of 9 nominations

Primetime Emmy awards 
5 wins of 17 nominations

Daytime Emmy awards 
1 win of 1 nomination

Tony Award 
1 wins of 2 nominations

Guild awards

Directors Guild Awards 
0 wins of 1 nomination

Screen Actors Guild Awards 
1 win of 18 nominations

Audience awards

People's Choice awards 
2 wins of 3 nominations

Teen Choice awards 
0 wins of 1 nomination

Critic and association awards

Critics Choice Television awards 
0 wins of 1 nomination

Satellite awards 
2 wins of 3 nominations

Television Critics Association awards 
0 wins of 2 nominations

Film festival awards

Banff Television Festival awards 
1 win of 1 nomination

International awards

American Comedy awards 
2 wins of 4 nominations

Miscellaneous awards

Golden Raspberry awards 
1 win of 1 nomination

MovieGuide awards 
0 wins of 1 nomination

Saturn awards 
0 wins of 1 nomination

TV Guide awards 
0 wins of 1 nomination

TV Land awards 
0 wins of 2 nominations

Viewers for Quality Television awards 
4 wins of 8 nominations

Walk of Fame 
1 win of 1 nomination

References

Grammer, Kelsey